Live from Texas is a live DVD/Blu-ray by ZZ Top. It was recorded on November 1, 2007, at the Nokia Theatre in Grand Prairie, Texas, and released on June 24, 2008, by Eagle Rock Records. It was also released on audio CD in Europe on October 28, 2008, and in the US on November 4, 2008. A vinyl version is also available in Europe.

Track listing
All songs by Billy Gibbons, Dusty Hill, Frank Beard except where noted.

DVD
"Got Me Under Pressure" – 4:24
"Waitin' for the Bus" (Gibbons, Hill) – 2:54
"Jesus Just Left Chicago" – 4:58
"I'm Bad, I'm Nationwide" – 4:40
"Pincushion" – 5:06
"Cheap Sunglasses" – 4:50
"Pearl Necklace" – 3:49
"Heard It on the X" – 3:51
"Just Got Paid" (Gibbons, Bill Ham) – 7:35
"Rough Boy" – 6:29
"Blue Jean Blues" – 4:57
"Gimme All Your Lovin'" – 4:35
"Sharp Dressed Man" – 4:55
"Legs" – 5:19
"Tube Snake Boogie" – 3:03
"La Grange" – 7:41
"Tush" – 6:14

CD
Due to the CD having a shorter run time than the DVD, "Heard It on the X" and "Pincushion" are omitted from the CD.

"Got Me Under Pressure"
"Waitin' for the Bus" (Gibbons, Hill)
"Jesus Just Left Chicago"
"I'm Bad, I'm Nationwide"
"Cheap Sunglasses"
"Pearl Necklace"
"Just Got Paid" (Gibbons, Ham)
"Rough Boy"
"Blues Intro"
"Blue Jean Blues"
"Gimme All Your Lovin'"
"Sharp Dressed Man"
"Legs"
"Tube Snake Boogie"
"La Grange"
"Tush"

Personnel
Frank Beard – drums, percussion
Billy Gibbons – vocals, guitar, harmonica
Dusty Hill – bass guitar, backing vocals, lead vocal on "Tush", co-lead vocals on "Got Me Under Pressure", "Pearl Necklace", and "Heard It on the X"

Charts

Certifications

References

ZZ Top video albums
2008 video albums
ZZ Top albums
Live video albums
2008 live albums